Partula emersoni is a species of air-breathing tropical land snail, a terrestrial pulmonate gastropod mollusk in the family Partulidae. This species is endemic to Micronesia.

References

Fauna of Micronesia
Partula (gastropod)
Taxonomy articles created by Polbot
Gastropods described in 1913